Thomas Oliver House is a historic home located at Lockport in Niagara County, New York.  It is a -story Queen Anne style brick dwelling built in 1891.

It was listed on the National Register of Historic Places in 1998.  It is located in the High and Locust Streets Historic District.

References

External links
Oliver, Thomas, House - Lockport, NY - U.S. National Register of Historic Places on Waymarking.com

Houses on the National Register of Historic Places in New York (state)
Queen Anne architecture in New York (state)
Houses completed in 1891
Houses in Niagara County, New York
National Register of Historic Places in Niagara County, New York
Historic district contributing properties in New York (state)